Emmanuel Vaughan-Lee (born 1979 in London, England) is a Emmy and Peabody award nominated filmmaker, a composer, and a Naqshbandi Sufi teacher. Emmanuel is the authorized successor of his father Llewellyn Vaughan-Lee, a Sufi mystic and lineage successor in the Naqshbandiyya-Mujaddidiyya Sufi Order.

Biography
Vaughan-Lee was trained from the age of 15 by his father in the Naqshbandiyya-Mujaddidiyya Sufi Order. He attended Berklee College of Music in Boston to pursue musical studies in acoustic bass, improvisation and composition. After graduating from Berklee in 2001, Vaughan-Lee performed and recorded with numerous jazz artists and released two albums under his own name – Previous Misconceptions (2001 – Emanjazz) and Borrowed Time (2005 –  Fresh Sound New Talent).

As a filmmaker he has directed and produced numerous award winning films and virtual reality experiences including:  Earthrise, Elemental, Yukon Kings, Isle de Jean Charles, Marie's Dictionary, Soleá, Sanctuaries of Silence, The Atomic Tree, Laugh Clown Laugh and What Would it Look Like.

His films have played at festivals including: New York Film Festival, Tribeca Film Festival, SXSW Film Festival, Thessalonioki Documentary Film Festival, Hot Docs, Camden Intl Film Festival, Melbourne Intl Film Festival, San Francisco Intl Film Festival and Sheffield Documentary Film Festival. They have been featured and distributed on PBS and PBS's POV, National Geographic, The New York Times, The Atlantic, The New Yorker, Outside, Within, and exhibited at the Smithsonian Museum and London Barbican.

In collaboration with composer H. Scott Salinas, he composed music for his films Elemental and Laugh Clown Laugh.

He is the founder and executive editor of Emergence magazine, a National Magazine Award nominated and Webby winning online publication, with an annual printed edition exploring the threads connecting ecology, culture and spirituality.

Filmography 
The Atomic Tree (2019)
Counter Mapping (2018)
Earthrise (2018)
Sanctuaries of Silence (2018)
Soleá (2015)
Laugh Clown Laugh (2014)
Marie's Dictionary (2014)
Isle de Jean Charles (2014)
Yukon Kings (2013)
Elemental (2012)
A Thousand Suns (2009)
What Would it Look Like (2009)
Barrio de Paz (2007)
The Land Owns Us (2007)

References

External links

Elemental the Film
Go Project Films
The Atomic Tree
Sanctuaries of Silence
Earthrise
Emergence Magazine

1979 births
Living people
British composers
British film directors
British film producers
British jazz musicians